Lord of the Fries is an Australian casual dining fast food chain.

Lord of the Fries may also refer to:

Lord of the Fries (card game)
Lord of the Fries, a 1994 album by the political satire group Capitol Steps
"Lord of the Fries", a 2005 episode of 15/Love
Lord of the Fries and Other Stories, a 1999 novel by Tim Wynne-Jones

See also
Lord of the Flies (disambiguation)